Petko Vasiljević (Serbian Cyrillic: Петко Васиљевић; 1780-1809) was a leading bimbashi of the  Timok district during the First Serbian Uprising. 

Among the volunteers who arrived in Belgrade, to join Karadorde's revolution were two brothers, Petko and Nina Vasiljević.

They came from their native village of Zagračani in Macedoniathat until recently had belonged to the Knjaževac district, but at that time belonged to the district of  Crna Reka.

When Hajduk Veljko went to Crna Reka to incite the people to rise against their subjugators, the Turks, Petko and Nina gladly joined him. Both were loyal to Veljko and Veljko reciprocated by elevating Petko to the Turkish military rank of major, bimbashi, and Nina received the mayorship -- knyaz -- of the township and district of Timok.

In a skirmish at Beligraći while storming the town, Petko was killed, and his brother Nina immediately took his place to lead the men.

References 

1780 births
1809 deaths

Timok Valley
First Serbian Uprising
Serbian revolutionaries
18th-century Serbian people
19th-century Serbian people
Ottoman Serbia
Serbian rebels